Domenico Calcagno (born 3 February 1943) is an Italian prelate of the Catholic Church. He has been a bishop since 2002 and a cardinal since 2012.
From 7 July 2011 to 26 June 2018 he was President of the Administration of the Patrimony of the Holy See, where he had served as secretary since 2007.

Biography
Calcagno was born in Tramontana di Parodi Ligure, in the Province of Alessandria on 3 February 1943. After studying arts at the diocesan seminary, he attended the Pontifical Gregorian University in Rome, earning a degree in dogmatic theology. He was ordained a priest on 29 June 1967 by Cardinal Giuseppe Siri.

After several years of parish ministry, he was appointed professor of theology at the Theological Faculty of Northern Italy and, later, at the Higher Institute of Religious Studies of Liguria. He served as president of the diocesan clergy institute and was the episcopal vicar for "new activities". At the national level his assignments included: Secretary of the Italian Priests Commission, Inspector of the Italian Episcopal Conference for Institutes of Religious Sciences, Director of National Missionary Cooperation between Churches, and Treasurer of the Bishops Conference.

Pope John Paul II appointed him Bishop of Savona-Noli on 25 January 2002. He was consecrated on 9 March. He served as Bishop of Savona until Pope Benedict appointed him Secretary of the Administration of the Patrimony of the Apostolic See (APSA) and with the personal title of archbishop on 7 July 2007. On 7 July 2011 he became its president.

On 20 February 2012 Pope Benedict created him Cardinal-Deacon assigned to the church of Annunciazione della Beata Vergine Maria a Via Ardeatina.

He was one of the cardinal electors who participated in the 2013 papal conclave that elected Pope Francis.

Pope Francis made him a member of the Congregation for Institutes of Consecrated Life and Societies of Apostolic Life on 29 March 2014.

In October 2016, when several cardinals protested his plan for the APSA to lease commercial space to McDonald's in a building where several cardinals live not far from St. Peter's Basilica, he dismissed their complaints. He said: "I don't see the scandal."

Francis accepted his resignation as President of the Administration of the Patrimony of the Holy See on 26 June 2018.

On 4 March 2022, he was elevated to the rank of cardinal priest.

References

External links
 

1943 births
Living people
Pontifical Gregorian University alumni
Administration of the Patrimony of the Apostolic See
Cardinals created by Pope Benedict XVI
21st-century Italian cardinals
Bishops of Savona
21st-century Italian Roman Catholic bishops